The Universidad Autónoma de Chile (UAutónoma) is a private Chilean university. It has campuses in Temuco, Talca and Santiago (Providencia and Llano Subercaseaux).

It is affiliated to SUA (Single Admission System of Rector's Council of Chilean Universities.

The university is accredited by CNA-Chile (National Accreditation commission) for a term of 4 years (a maximum of seven years), from October 2019 to October 2023. UA ranks as the 23rd best university in Chile according to webometric classification of CSIC (June 2017), 61st in Latin America according to the Times Higher Education Latin American University Rankings. Among Chilean universities is currently among the top 14 of Scimago Institution Rankings (SIR) 2020, 19th at national level and 747 at international level.

UA has a television channel Universidad Autónoma de Chile Televisión.

History 

UAutónoma was founded on August 11, 1989 in Temuco city, capital of Araucanía region of Chile, under the name of "Universidad Autónoma de Sur", and subsequently, in 2006 changed its name to "Universidad Autónoma de Chile".

The university has full autonomy, which allows it to directly grant degree and diplomas.  After its autonomy certification by High Education Board of Chile, the university has continued to maintain its institutional quality, for which has continued the process of homologation and the recognition of its degree plans and programs with Spanish universities of high tradition, such as those of Universidad de Barcelona, Universidad de Salamanca and Universidad de Sevilla, inter alia.

In January 2003, UAutonoma inaugurated its Talca campus in the facilities of Instituto Profesional Valle Central. By May of the same year El Llano Subercaseaux campus was settled in San Miguel commune, in the facilities of the former San Andrés University.

By 2009, Providencia campus was open, and a year later the university bought INCACEA's Institute of Sciences and Arts -which was in bankruptcy- to reinforce the brand and launch technical and professional studies academic offer, with headquarters in Las Condes and Viña de Mar. In 2012, after CAN-Chile refusal of accreditation, INCACEA closed down Viña del Mar campus.

In 2005, the university incorporated the new Providencia campus, with over 33,000 square meters.

Administration

Presidents 
 Teodoro Ribera Neumann (1998–2011)
 Ernesto Schifelbein (2011-2015)
 Teodoro Ribera Neumann (2015–2019)
 José Antonio Galilea Vidaurre (2019 - 2020)
Teodoro Ribera Neumann (2020 - Present)

Campuses 

thumb|Campus Talca.
 Santiago:
 Campus Providencia: Av. Pedro de Valdivia #425 - Av. Pedro de Valdivia #641
 Campus El Llano Subercaseaux: Ricardo Morales #3369 (San Miguel).
 Temuco: 
Campus Temuco: Av. Alemania #01090.
 Talca: 5 poniente #1670.

Undergratuate Programs  

UAutónoma offers undergraduate and postgraduate programs; courses, diploma courses, magister and doctoral studies. 88.5% of its degrees are accredited and 90.4% of its students are enrolled in certificated degrees that have this quality certification granted in 2016.

It is also affiliated with SUA (Single Admission System of Rector's Council of Chilean Universities).

Faculty of Health Sciences 
 Nursing
 Phonoaudiology
 Kinesiology
 Medicine
 Nutrition and Dietetics
 Obstetrics and Pediatrics
 Odontology
 Occupational Therapy
 Chemistry and Pharmacy

Faculty of Architecture and Construction 
 Architecture
 Construction or Civil Construction Engineering

Faculty of Business and Administration 
 Audit and Management Control Engineering
 Business Administration Engineering
 Commercial Engineering

Faculty of Social Sciences and Humanities 
 Public Administration
 Psychology
 Advertising and Comprehensive Communication
 Social Work
 Journalism

Faculty of Law 
 Law

Faculty of Education 
 Bachelor in Visual Arts
 Pedagogy in Elementary Education
 Pedagogy in Physical Education
 Pedagogy in Early Childhood Education
 Pedagogy in History, Geography and Social Sciences
 Pedagogy in English
 Pedagogy in Spanish Language and Communication
 Bachelor of Special Education

Faculty of Engineering 
 Civil Computer Engineering
 Civil Industrial Engineering
 Chemical Engineering

Postgraduate Studies

PhD Programs  
PhD Biomedical Science
PhD Law
PhD History

Master Degrees 

For further info refer to: https://www.uautonoma.cl/postgrados/magisteres/

Research 

Institute of Municipal Studies (ICHEM)

Institute of Biomedical Sciences

Institute of Applied Chemical Sciences

Habitat Studies Institute
Institute of Social and Humanistic Studies
Law Research Institute 
Institute of Studies in Educational Sciences

References

External links 

 Universidad Autónoma de Chile Sitio oficial
 Vista aérea vía Google Maps Vista de la Casa Central (Temuco)
 La Universidad en Rankings Nacionales e Internacionales
 Universidad Autónoma de Chile Televisión Canal universitario
 Instituto Profesional INCACEA Instituto de Ciencias & Artes

Universities in Chile
Nursing schools in Chile
Educational institutions established in 1989
Universities in Santiago Metropolitan Region
1989 establishments in Chile